This Palladius table is a complete listing of all Palladius system syllables used in cyrillization of Standard Chinese. Each syllable in a cell is composed of an initial (columns) and a final (rows). An empty cell indicates that the corresponding syllable does not exist in Standard Chinese.  

The below table indicates possible combinations of initials and finals in Standard Chinese, but does not indicate tones, which are equally important to the proper pronunciation of Chinese.  Although some initial-final combinations have some syllables using each of the five different tones, most do not.  Some utilize only one tone. Finals are grouped into subsets а (a), и (i), у (u) and юй (ü).

Syllables with final о have multiple counterparts in different romanization systems
{|class=wikitable style="text-align:center;"
!IPA
|pu̯ɔ||pʰu̯ɔ||mu̯ɔ||fu̯ɔ||tu̯ɔ||tʰu̯ɔ||nu̯ɔ||lu̯ɔ||ku̯ɔ||kʰu̯ɔ||xu̯ɔ||ʈʂu̯ɔ||ʈʂʰu̯ɔ||ʂu̯ɔ||ʐu̯ɔ||ʦu̯ɔ||ʦʰu̯ɔ||su̯ɔ
|-
!Palladius
|бо||по||мо||фо||до||то||но||ло||го||ко||хо||чжо||чо||шо||жо||цзо||цо||со
|-
!Wade–Giles
|po||p'o||mo||fo||to||t'o||no||lo||kuo||k'uo||huo||cho||ch'o||shuo||jo||tso||ts'o||so
|-
!Pinyin
|bo||po||mo||fo||duo||tuo||nuo||luo||guo||kuo||huo||zhuo||chuo||shuo||ruo||zuo||cuo||suo
|-
!Bopomofo
|ㄅㄛ||ㄆㄛ||ㄇㄛ||ㄈㄛ||ㄉㄨㄛ||ㄊㄨㄛ||ㄋㄨㄛ||ㄌㄨㄛ||ㄍㄨㄛ||ㄎㄨㄛ||ㄏㄨㄛ||ㄓㄨㄛ||ㄔㄨㄛ||ㄕㄨㄛ||ㄖㄨㄛ||ㄗㄨㄛ||ㄘㄨㄛ||ㄙㄨㄛ
|}

See also
Cyrillization of Chinese
Pinyin table
Wade–Giles table
Zhuyin table

Transcription of Chinese
Mandarin words and phrases